Universum may refer to:

Universum (journal), an academic journal
Universum (magazine), an Austrian popular science magazine
Universum (building), on the campus of Umeå University, Sweden
Universum (band), an Australian melodic death metal band
Universum Science Center, a science museum in Bremen, Germany
Universum Film, a film company that was the principal film studio in Germany
Universum (UNAM), a science museum with the National Autonomous University of Mexico
Am Universum Amorphis' fifth studio album
Vi veri universum vivus vici, a Latin phrase meaning: "By the power of truth, I, while living, have conquered the universe"
Kino Universum

See also
 Universe (disambiguation)